Ballader och grimascher (English: Ballads and grimaces) is the second studio album by Swedish-Dutch folk singer-songwriter Cornelis Vreeswijk. The album was recorded in Metronome Studio with producer Anders Burman.

Track listing
Music and lyrics by Cornelis Vreeswijk.

 "Sportiga Marie"
 "Ballad om censuren"
 "Esmeralda"
 "Ballad om 100 år"
 "Horoskopsvisan"
 "Lasse Liten blues"
 "Jultomten är faktiskt död"
 "Tänk om jag hade en sabel"
 "Dekadans"
 "Grimasch om morgonen"
 "Balladen om ett munspel"
 "Slusk-blues"

Personnel
 Cornelis Vreeswijk - guitar, vocals
 Jan Johansson - piano

References

Cornelis Vreeswijk albums
1965 albums
Swedish-language albums